The Power of the Past (also known as Truth and Lies) is a 2002 Italian drama film directed by Piergiorgio Gay. It is based on the novel with the same name written by Sandro Veronesi. It entered the main competition at the 59th Venice International Film Festival.

Plot

Cast 
 Sergio Rubini as Gianni Orzan
 Bruno Ganz as Bogliasco
 Valeria Moriconi as Mother of Gianni
 Mariangela D'Abbraccio as Mother of Matteo
 Sandra Ceccarelli as  Anna Orzan
 Giuseppe Battiston as  Night Porter
 Aleksander Krosl as  Arkady Fokin

See also 
 List of Italian films of 2002

References

External links

 Plot summary

2002 films
Italian drama films
2002 drama films
2000s Italian-language films
Films based on Italian novels
Films based on works by Sandro Veronesi
2000s Italian films